KMAD is a radio station airing a country music format, licensed to Madill, Oklahoma and broadcasting on 1550 kHz AM. The station is owned by Richard Witkovski, through licensee North Texas Radio Group, L.P.

Translators

References

External links

Classic country radio stations in the United States
MAD